Chetumal, or the Province of Chetumal was a Postclassic Mayan state in the Yucatan Peninsula.<ref
group="note">The Chetumal Province has been called a chiefdom by some authors. A distinction has been made, however, between chiefdoms and states, the latter being characterised by more complex forms of sociopolitical organisation than the former. Accordingly, the province is herein designated a state, and not a chiefdom.
</ref>

History

Pre-Columbian

Prior to Classic collapse 

The first settlements in Chetumal were established by Palaeo-indians before 8000 BC, during the Lithic Period of Mesoamerica. The first permanent settlements in Chetumal are believed to have been established by Mayan farmers from the Guatemalan highlands by 2000 BC, during the Archaic period of Mesoamerica. The first state or province encompassing Mayan settlements in Chetumal is presumed to have been formed by 100 AD, during the Late Preclassic period of Mesoamerica.

Proximal to Classic collapse 

The completion of the Classic Mayan collapse in Yucatan saw both the formation of Mayan provinces and the imperial expansion of Chichen Itza over these provinces, or their constituent cities. The collapse does not seem to have been catastrophic in the (future) territory of Chetumal. At least twenty-five settlements in the area are known to have survived, most likely by reorienting economic activity towards the Chichen Itza-driven coasting trade.<ref
group="note">Namely–
 on New River – Cerros, Aventura, Lamanai, San Estevan, Chau Hiix, and one unnamed site,
 on Hondo River – Nohmul, Consejo, Chan Chen, San Antonio ,
 on Corozal Bay – Santa Rita,
 inland – Altun Ha, Colha, Honey Camp Lagoon / Laguna de On, Kichpanha,
 on Ambergris Caye – Marco Gonzalez, San Juan, Chac Balam ,
 on Northern River Lagoon – Cabbage Ridge / Saktunja ,
 on Progresso Lagoon – Caye Coco, and five unnamed sites .
</ref> There is, nonetheless, evidence of limited social upheaval.<ref
group="note">Namely–
 Colha is thought to have been attacked and thereafter settled by northern polities, (patterns in its Postclassic material culture have been described as "totally different from those of the Classic period"),
 Nohmul is thought to have been attacked and thereafter settled by northern polities,
 mass executions of the local aristocracy have been suggested .
</ref>

Chichen Itza, established by Itza settlers in circa 750–800 AD, was the most powerful city-state in the Yucatan peninsula until circa 1050–1100 AD.<ref
group="note">The city is known to have been conquered or sacked towards circa 1050–1100 AD . Later Columbian-period accounts hold that Hunak Ke'el, ruler of Mayapan, conquered Chichen Itza, thereby cementing his city's rule over the latter's dominions.
</ref><ref
group="note">At least three other dates proximal to the 1050–1100 AD date have been suggested for the end of Chichen Itza's dominance over the Yucatan peninsula–
 1000–1050 AD ,
 1100–1200 AD ,
 1200–1250 AD .
</ref> It appears to have started a sustained, and successful, programme of conquest in circa 900 AD, resulting in the formation of various provinces, possibly or likely including Chetumal.<ref
group="note">Said conquest most likely extended at least throughout central Yucatan . It has been further suggested that the city-state established direct rule, whether by conquest or the threat thereof, over key ports in the coasting trade which circumnavigated Yucatan, from the Chontalpa region to the Bay Islands . One of these may have been Nohmul in Chetumal, where a colonnaded courtyard building, apparently styled after those of Chichen Itza, has been excavated .
</ref>

Posterior to Classic collapse 

Mayapan succeeded Chichen Itza as the most powerful city-state in Yucatan during k'atun 8 ahaw, equivalent either to 1080–1104 AD, or to 1185–1204 AD. Its rule lasted thirteen k'atuno'ob, thereby ending either during 1392–1416 AD, or 1441–1461 AD.<ref
group="note">Various Columbian-period accounts detail Mayapan's history during these thirteen k'atuno'ob. However, two k'atuno'ob were in use then— (i) the Classical k'atun of 7,200 days (circa 19.713 tropical years), and (ii) a later ahaw k'atun of circa 24 tropical years. This has resulted in much uncertainty regarding Mayapan's chronology .
</ref><ref
group="note">It has been suggested the rise of Mayapan was preceded by a breakdown of the peninsular coasting trade .
</ref>

During circa 1450 to 1500 AD, Pachimalahix I, fifth ruler of the Acalan, led a military force to the Chetumal capital, and exacted tribute. Further details on this event remain obscure, though given the reputed commercial pre-eminence of the provincial capital at the time, it has been suggested that Pachimalahix I rather raided the city to settle trade-related damages, rather than actually having exacted tribute.

Columbian

First contacts with Spaniards 

The first Spaniard known to have arrived in Chetumal was Gonzalo Guerrero, a sailor from Palos de la Frontera, Spain. In 1514, Guerrero entered the civil or military service in Chetumal. He was likely gifted to Gov. Kan as a slave by a batab or mayor from the Ekab Province.<ref
group="note">The Ekab Province seems to have lacked a halach winik or governor, and was likely rather organised as a confederation of towns. It has been suggested that the Pat ch'ibal or noble house were the most influential in the province .
</ref> By 1519, Guerrero had fully assimilated to Mayan culture, having married Gov. Kan's daughter and fathered three children with her. Guerrero would thereafter devise or at least contribute to the military strategy of Chetumal and other Mayan states against at least three Spanish entradas.

Three events pre-dating the 1514 arrival of Guerrero to Chetumal have been proposed as marking the first contact by residents of Chetumal with Spaniards:

 The 1511 arrival of Guerrero and his marooned shipmates to Cozumel<ref
group="note"> gives their arrival date as 1512.
</ref>
 The 1508 voyage of Juan Díaz de Solís and Vicente Yáñez Pinzón to Lake Izabal
 The 1502 voyage by Christopher Columbus to Guanaja

Mayan settlements near Cozumel, Lake Izabal, and Guanaja are known to have been part of the riverine and coastal trading networks of merchants in Chetumal. Any knowledge of non-Indian people obtained by the former is thus presumed to have been passed on to the latter. It has further been suggested that the Ekab Province may have been allied with Chetumal.

Cuban expeditions to Yucatan 

Hispano-Mayan hostilities commenced on 5 March 1517 in Cape Catoche, when an expeditionary force led by Francisco Hernández de Córdoba was ambushed by the military or militia of the Ekab Province, near that state's eponymous capital. The Hernández expedition were similarly received by neighbouring Mayan polities, thereby foiling the expedition's pecuniary aims. <ref
group="note">Antón de Alamilla, chief pilot of the flotilla of 3 ships and over 100 men, seems to have convinced Hernández de Córdoba to sail directly westwards of Cuba, thereby taking them to the Ekab Province. (The expedition's initial destination was apparently either the Bahamas or the Bay Islands.) Alamilla had sailed with Christopher Columbus on his fourth voyage of 1502–1504 . 
</ref>

The expeditionaries' reports of grand Mayan cities would nonetheless spur further Cuban expeditions to Yucatan, including a 1518 trading and reconnoitering voyage by Juan de Grijalva and another in 1519 by Hernán Cortés, the latter of which quickly morphed into the 1519–1521 Spanish conquest of the Aztec Empire and the 1519–1521 smallpox epidemic.<ref
group="note">The Grijalva expedition, of 4 ships and 250–300 men, and the Cortés one, of 10 ships and circa 400 men, were piloted by Antón de Alamilla, and included Pedro de Alvarado, Alonso Dávila, and Francisco de Montejo as principal subordinates. The former's survey of Laguna de Términos led to a mistaken belief that Yucatan was an island . 
</ref> The epidemic is presumed to have affected Chetumal severely. The reports likewise prompted the Governor of Cuba, who had commissioned the Hernández expedition, to petition and be granted letter patent authorising his conquest of the Mayan states on behalf of the Charles I of Spain. The newly-minted adelantado, however, did not proceed with the conquest of Yucatan.

Montejo entrada, 1527–1528 

On 8 December 1526, the Salamancan conquistador Francisco de Montejo, who had participated in the Grijalva and Cortés expeditions from Cuba, was granted letters patent for the conquest of Yucatan and Cozumel by Charles I of Spain. Unlike Gov. Velázquez, former holder of the patent, Montejo promptly undertook the called-for conquest.<ref
group="note">The petition was formally made on 16 November 1526, and supported Pánfilo de Narváez and Antonio de Sedeño. His letters patent required that the conquest begin within a year .
</ref>

The adelantado named his close colleague, Alonso Dávila, likewise a participant in the Grijalva and Cortés expeditions from Cuba, the principal lieutenant for his entrada. They engaged 4 ships and over 250 men in Seville, from where they embarked in late June 1527, landing in Cozumel in late September 1527.<ref
group="note">The ships were— (i) the San Jerónimo, Miguel Ferrer master, (ii) Nicolasa, Ochoa master,  (iii) La Gavarra, master not named, and (iv) a fourth unnamed ship, master likewise not named. The adelantado’s principal subordinates were Alonso Dávila, Antón Sánchez Calabrés, Pedro de los Ríos, Pedro de Añasco, Pedro de Lugones, Pedro González, Hernando Palomino, Pedro Gaitán, and possibly Andrés de Calleja and Roberto Alemán. Crown representatives Pedro de Luna and Hernando de Cueto accompanied the expedition, as did frays Juan Rodríguez de Caraveo, Pedro Fernández, and Gregorio de San Martín. The flotilla was thoroughly refitted at Santo Domingo .
</ref>

Northern campaign, autumn 1527 – summer 1528 

They watered in Cozumel for a few days, upon their warm reception by residents and Naum Pat, an influential batab or mayor in Cozumel, and thereafter proceeded to the mainland.<ref
group="note">It has been suggested that the Pat ch'ibal or noble house were the most influential house in the Ekab Province, which is thought to have encompassed Cozumel . At least two towns are known to have existed in Cozumel prior to the Spanish conquest. These were later known as San Miguel Xamancab and Santa María Oycib. A third town, possibly Tantun, has been suggested .
</ref> They explored the immediate area, being well received by the nearby towns of Xelha and Zama, and founded a settlement, christened Salamanca, in October 1527. Their substantial demands for foodstuffs soon grew irksome to locals, upon which Salamanca saw their supplies dwindle. In late 1527 or early 1528, after a trying period of near-famine and disease, the Spanish moved northwards. With Naum Pat’s intercession, they were well received throughout the Ekab Province.<ref
group="note">The Spanish chanced upon Naum Pat at Xamanha, and readily accepted his offer of diplomatic aid . Good will was further maintained by the fluency in Yucatecan Mayan of some officers and friars, fine displays of horsemanship, and strict discipline. Note that horses inspired awe and terror in the locals, the latter being unaccustomed to the former .
</ref> They entered Chauaka, capital of the Chikinchel Province, in spring of 1528. A battle ensued, which Montejo won, thereby forcing Chikinchel to sue for peace. They next headed to Ake, where the Battle of Ake was likewise won by Montejo, after which they headed back to Salamanca, reaching it mid- or late summer 1528.<ref
group="note">Their traverse may have involved engagements with the military or militia of the Sotuta and Kupul Provinces .
</ref> Here, they were provisioned from Santo Domingo, whereupon they embarked on a combined entrada by land and sea southwards.

Southern campaign, summer 1528 

Montejo was to hug the coast with eight to ten men aboard the brigantine or caravel La Gavarra. Dávila was to take a parallel route by land, with the majority of the soldiers.
<ref
group="note">A small contingent of twenty men stayed at Salamanca, under Alonso de Luján. They were to build a small craft and follow Montejo post haste . It is not immediately clear how many men constituted the Dávila party. The La Gavarra, which provisioned the men from Santo Domingo, is thought to have found seventy to seventy-five men at Salamanca, suggesting a party of fifty to fifty-five men accompanied Dávila southwards . On the other hand,  gives the number as circa forty soldiers in the Dávila party.
</ref> The provincial capital of Chetumal, which had been set as the parties’ rendezvous point, was first reached by Montejo.<ref
group="note">The details of their crossing the barrier reef, and of their navigating its inner waters, are not clear, though this was apparently accomplished with their brig, the ‘’La Guevarra’’, rather than with a much smaller craft of lower draught .
</ref> Unsure of the reception awaiting them, Montejo and his men kidnapped three or four residents under the cover of darkness to gather intelligence. Upon learning of Guerrero, now the nakom or commander-in-chief of the capital’s forces, Montejo dispatched one of the captives to the former, inviting the commander to break ranks and join the Spanish conquest. This being summarily spurned, the capital was prepared for battle.  The commander’s strategy was apparently to keep the Dávila and Montejo parties separated.<ref
group="note">Chetumal seems to have known of the Dávila party in advance, though it is not clear that they similarly knew of the Montejo party until the adelantado’s note to Guerrero. Dávila was at present thirty leagues north of the capital .
</ref> Guides were or had been sent, under pretence of alliance, to lead Dávila west of the capital, and thereafter inform him that the Montejo party had been lost.  The greater threat thus despatched, the capital turned towards Montejo. Feigning good will, residents ministered to Montejo and his men, and further informed the adelantado that the Dávila party had all perished. This bluff likewise worked, and the adelantado promptly set sail south towards Ulua River, and then back north towards Salamanca. Montejo soon discovered the ruse, and determined to gather reinforcements at Veracruz for a renewed offensive on Chetumal.<ref
group="note">Salamanca had been removed north towards Xamanha by Dávila and Lujan. The Chetumal capital seems to have been determined as the immediate target due to its exceedingly good harbour .
</ref> He most likely set sail for that city in summer 1528.<ref
group="note">By December 1528, Montejo and his alférez mayor, Gonzalo Nieto, had engaged sufficient men, provisions, and two large vessels in Veracruz and Mexico City for a renewed campaign . These plans were abruptly upset, however, when the adelantado received the Real Audiencia of Mexico's authorisation to conquer the Tabasco and Acalan regions of New Spain .
</ref>

Davila entrada, 1531–1533 

In early 1531, the adelantado, having brought the Chakan, Can Pech, and Ah Canul Provinces under Spanish authority, promptly set about planning a renewed campaign towards Chetumal. Alonso Dávila was appointed to lead the expedition of circa fifty men.<ref
group="note">Dávila's men included the adelantado's fifteen-year-old nephew, Francisco de Montejo, and thirteen cavalry. In addition, two Yucatecan Mayan interpreters, a mining expert (Francisco Vázquez), and possibly a friar accompanied them .
</ref>

Waymil–Chetumal campaign, summer 1531 

Dávila set out from the provincial capital of Can Pech in mid-1531. They marched through the Mani and Cochuah Provinces unopposed, shortly thereafter reaching Chable, a town in the Waymil Province. Pre-eminent individuals in town promptly offered assistance, and were despatched to the provincial capital of Bacalar to summon the batab or mayor.<ref
group="note">It has been suggested that this assistance was compelled by force of arms, rather than freely proffered .
</ref> The summons being rebuffed, Dávila marched on, leaving half of his men in Chable.<ref
group="note">The batab or mayor of Bacalar was apparently under the authority of the Governor of Chetumal, Nachan Kan. (The Waymil Province seems to have lacked a halach winik or governor, and was likely rather organised as a confederation of towns, per .) Notably, his reply to Dávila's summons declared that Waymil or Chetumal would give his men "[tribute of] fowls in the form of their [the locals'] lances and maize in the form of their arrows" .
</ref><ref
group="note"> asserts that mediators from Chable were rather despatched to the capital of Chetumal, to summon Gov. Kan, and not the Waymil capital of Bacalar, since the former held authority over the latter, thereby making him the more suitable person for Dávila to deal with. The Chable messengers would have nonetheless passed Bacalar en route to Chetumal .
</ref> They next reached Maçanahau, a large town close to Lake Bacalar. Being well received, Dávila and his men stayed here for three weeks, during which time the diplomatic aid of leading individuals from various provincial towns seems to have convinced the batab or mayor of Bacalar to not oppose the entrada.<ref
group="note">Leading residents of Chable, who had previously proffered assistance upon Dávila's arrival, had accompanied the reduced expedition to Maçanahau. Dávila had further received offers of mediation from respected residents of Maçanahau and Yuyumpeten, a nearby town .
</ref> Consequently, the party continued their march to Bacalar unopposed. An overland march to Chetumal, Dávila soon found out, was not possible. Sea transport on several large canoes was thus arranged. They disembarked at Chetumal unopposed, as the capital had been deserted. Nevertheless, per his instructions, Dávila decided to found a town in Chetumal. The rest of the party, who had been left in Chable, were called for, and the new settlement at Chetumal christened Villa Real.<ref
group="note">The adelantado had instructed Dávila to establish a Spanish settlement wherever Dávila thought best. The new town would apparently serve to administer the Cochuah, Waymil and Chetumal Provinces, once these were all under Spanish rule. One of the founding regidores or councilmen of Villa Real was Montejo, the young nephew of the eponymous adelantado . The alcaldes or mayors were Martín de Villarubia and Francisco Vázquez, and the remaining regidores were Cristóbal Cisneros, Blas Maldonado, and Alonso de Arévalo .
</ref>

Settlement and siege of Villa Real, summer 1531 – autumn 1532 

In the next two months, the Governor of Chetumal, Nachan Kan, rallied the provincial forces at Chequitaquil, a coastal town four leagues north of the capital. On learning this, Dávila ordered a pre-emptive strike. A unit of circa twenty-five soldiers took the encampment by surprise. The assault was a partial success, resulting in the death of many of the provinces men, imprisonment of over sixty, and dispersal of all others. The principal target, Gov. Kan, had nonetheless made his escape.<ref
group="note">The assault yielded over sixty prisoners and loot worth circa 600 to 1,000 pesos. The capital's commander-in-chief, Gonzalo Guerrero, is presumed to have been with Gov. Kan at Chequitaquil, and to have likewise escaped. The captives, however, informed Dávila that Guerrero had previously died.
</ref>

Now safely ensconced at the Chetumal capital (now Villa Real), Dávila set out with twenty men on a survey of the newly-Spanish territory towards Maçanahau. Upon reaching Bacalar, Dávila, to his great surprise, was informed that residents of Maçanahau and other provincial towns of Waymil had resolved to oppose him. The towns and their access roads had been barricaded. The opposition, though, was soon routed.<ref
group="note">First at Maçanahau, then at Chable .
</ref> In the meantime, the recently-conquered Cochuah Province had revolted. Dávila resupplied at Villa Real and set off with twenty-two men to suppress the revolt.<ref
group="note">Leaving some twenty-odd men at Villa Real. At Bacalar, some 600 locals from the various towns of Waymil, including many provincial or municipal officers, accompanied Dávila to Cochuah . Some to most of the Waymil allies would later desert Dávila to join the Cochuah revolt . It has been suggested that the Governor of Chetumal, Nachan Kan, and his commander-in-chief, Gonzalo Guerrero, played a part in spreading the revolt  .
</ref> Unlike the limited rebellion in Waymil, the Cochuah revolt proved serious and widespread, forcing Dávila to retreat to Villa Real. The Spanish settlement was now under heavy siege. With only some thirty men fit for combat, five horses, and depleting stores, their situation was precarious.<ref
group="note">Eleven of the fifty-odd men who had set out from the Can Pech capital in mid-1531 had died, leaving some forty men at Villa Real, of whom ten were reportedly maimed .
</ref>

Dávila soon learnt of a sizeable convoy preparing to set sail near Villa Real for trade towards the Ulua River. He had the merchants and their articles seized.<ref
group="note">By a small party, led by Martín de Villarubia.
</ref> Since his prisoners included the son of the batab or mayor of Tapaen, a provincial town in Waymil, Dávila kept the son hostage and despatched two merchants to summon the mayor, who promptly called. The mayor was given a month to secure communication with the adelantado in the capital of the Can Pech Province, and promised his son in return. Believing his son would be released regardless, the mayor dallied. Upon learning of the mayor's ill faith, Dávila had him and his retinue tortured.<ref
group="note">The mayor had been summoned to Villa Real upon the expiration of the month he had been given .
</ref> To prove "whether the son had more love for the father, than the father had for the son," Dávila now despatched the mayor's son to the adelantado in Can Pech, keeping the mayor hostage. This arrangement also faltered.<ref
group="note">The mayor's son had also been given a month to secure the adelantado's reply. When said time was up, Dávila had led a detachment to Tapaen, where he was informed by captives that the mayor's son had made no attempt to reach the Can Pech capital .
</ref>

Retreat from Villa Real, autumn 1532 – spring 1533 

The siege wore on for months, as it became increasingly clear to the men that the situation was untenable. In autumn 1532, Dávila and the cabildo or town council resolved to retreat to Trujillo by sea.<ref
group="note">Villa Real was to be re-established somewhere south of the Chetumal capital, if possible .
</ref> They reached Puerto Caballos in spring 1533, after an arduous journey of seven months.<ref
group="note">The retreat, aboard thirty-two canoes, was led by (captive) local merchants. Though swift and surreptitious, locals learnt of the retreat, and unsuccessfully pursued the Spanish for a day . Dávila and his men, despite the able guidance of their captive merchants, sailed only six to seven leagues each day, constantly fighting a treacherous sea. Raids on riverine settlements, and craft and goods seized from travelling merchants, supplemented the Spaniards' stores .
</ref>

Pacheco entrada, 1543–1544 

In April 1543, the Adelantado commissioned Gaspar Pacheco to conquer Chetumal and Waymil. Pacheco enlisted twenty-five to thirty men in Merida, and named Melchor Pacheco his principal subordinate, and Alonso Pacheco third in command.<ref
</ref> The expedition set out in late 1543 or early 1544.

Pacheco and his men first reached the Spanish-controlled Cochuah Province. Their demands on the war-stricken residents here proved impossible to meet. The party nonetheless impressed men and women as servants, and seized so much food as to reduce the province to famine. At this point, having fallen ill, Gaspar Pacheco tasked Melchor Pacheco, his second-in-command, with the conquest of Waymil and Chetumal.<ref
group="note">Gaspar Pacheco returned to Merida to recuperate. Alonso Pacheco was now Melchor Pacheco's principal subordinate .
</ref>

Marching onwards to Waymil and Chetumal, the Pachecos soon discovered that residents had burnt their crops and fled to the woods, determined on guerrilla warfare to oppose them. Exasperated, the Pachecos now resorted to wanton acts of cruelty, including:
 clubbing captives to death,
 drowning captives,
 sicking dogs on unarmed civilians, and allowing the dogs to maul them to death, and
 mutilating captives.<ref
group="note">It has been suggested that Melchor Pacheco's second-in-command, Alonso Pacheco, was the officer most responsible for these acts . The lack of clergymen in the expedition has further been cited as a contributing factor .
</ref><ref
group="note">The Pacheco entrada is now commonly described as one of, if not the, bloodiest and cruelest campaigns in the Spanish conquest of Yucatan. On 10 February 1548, Franciscan Fray Lorenzo de Bienvenida described it to Charles I of Spain thus–Nero was not more cruel than this man [Alonso Pacheco]. He passed forward [from the Cochuah Province] and reached a province called Chetumal, which was at peace. Even though the natives did not make war, he robbed the province and consumed the foodstuffs of the natives, who fled into the bush in fear of the Spaniards, since as soon as [A. Pacheco] captured any of them, he set the dogs on them. And the Indians fled from all this and did not sow their crops, and all died of hunger. I say all, because there were towns [in Chetumal] of five hundred and one thousand houses, and now [10 Feb. 1548] one which has one hundred is large. This province [of Chetumal] was also rich in cacao. This captain [A. Pacheco], with his own hands committed outrages: he killed many with the garrote, saying, "This is a good rod with which to punish these people," and, after he had killed them, he said, "Oh how well I finished them off." Tying them to stakes, he cut the breasts off many women, and hands, noses, and ears off the men, and he tied squashes to the feet of women and threw them in the lakes to drown merely to amuse himself. He committed other great cruelties which I shall not mention for lack of space. He destroyed the entire province. [Then the Spaniards] founded a town of eight vecinos, which is called Salamanca, a halting town which has neither a cleric nor a church, nor do the Spaniards there confess, since the town is sixty leagues from this city [of Merida]. If [the Chetumal Province] had not been destroyed it would have supported [a town of] thirty men [vecinos]. And for his cruelties they [the cabildo of Merida] returned this captain [A. Pacheco] to the province which he destroyed and gave him its best Indians, and in doing this they did not give him something which was of small value. Such is the justice rendered in this land. . (Fray Bienvenida established a mission in Bacalar in circa 1546, and may have stayed there for about a year .) In circa 1566 in Relación de las cosas de Yucatán, Bishop Diego de Landa similarly reported–The Indians of the provinces of Cochua and Chetuma revolted, the Spaniards pacified them in such a way, that these provinces which were formerly the thickest settled and the most populous, remained the most desolate of all the country; committing upon them unheard-of cruelties, cutting off noses, arms and legs, and the breasts of women; throwing them into deep lagoons with gourds tied to their feet; stabbing the little children because they did not walk as fast as their mothers; and if those whom they drove along, chained together around the neck, fell sick or did not move along as fast as the others they cut off their heads between the others, so as not to stop and untie them. With like inhuman treatment as this did they drag along in their train for their service a large number of male and female captives. And it is said the Don Francisco de Montejo did not commit any of these barbarities nor was he present at them. On the contrary they seemed very evil to him, but he could do nothing more. 
</ref><ref
group="note">Criminal charges were brought against the Pachecos for cruelties committed during their entrada. The Spanish Crown further commissioned an enquiry . The Adelantado, Francisco de Montejo, was ultimately held responsible for these and other alleged crimes.
</ref>

The Spanish thus avoided a war of attrition. By early 1544, local opposition was so inconsequential as to convince the Pachecos to establish a town, christened Salamanca, in the ruins of Bacalar.<ref
Its founding alcaldes or mayors were Alonso and Melchor Pacheco. Its regidores or councilmen then were Pedro de Avila, Alonso Hernández, and Juan Farfán .
</ref> The victory proved pyrrhic, as the entrada resulted in very significant depopulation of the Waymil and Chetumal Provinces, thereby ensuring the permanent poverty of Salamanca.

Society

Religion 

Chichen Itza is known to have (coercively) sponsored the pre-eminent worship of K'uk'ulkan.<ref
group="note">Though the god's introduction to the Mayan pantheon likely preceded the arrival of the Itza to Yucatan, via pre-existing trade links with the Aztec civilisation .
</ref> The Cult of K'uk'ulkan is thought to have been the first state religion to transcend linguistic and ethnic differences in Mesoamerica. The Cult is believed to have strengthened or been strengthened by the peninsular coasting trade.

It has been suggested that the province was home to a cult of Itzamna which focussed on the god's connection to large ocean creatures. He has featured prominently in material finds from Chetumal which, unusually, frequently depict him emerging from the jaws of sea creatures.

Government

Pre-Columbian 

Chichen Itza is believed to have been governed either by a multepal or council of lords, or by a king and a privy council.<ref
group="note">That is, the city-state was likely not ruled solely by a king. Despite this, one of Chichen Itza's known rulers, K'ak' u Pakal, may have been a divine king. Furthermore, it has been proposed that K'uk'ulkan or Feathered Serpent was a title for Chichen Itza's (non-divine) kings (.
</ref><ref
group="note">In the case of rule by a king and privy council, it has been further suggested that the balance of power lay with the council during the city's earlier history, and thereafter lay with the king .</ref> It has been suggested that the city-state's realm was administered as a confederacy of provinces.

Mayapan is commonly held to have been ruled by a multepal or council of lords, composed of members from the Canul, Chel, Cocom, Cupul, and Xiu ch'ibalo'ob or noble houses.<ref
group="note">It has been suggested that, of these five houses, the Xius were initially the pre-eminent one, followed sometime thereafter by the Cocoms . On the other hand, this Xiu–Cocom pre-eminence may have been at least a de facto monarchy .</ref> Its realm is believed to have been organised as a confederation of provinces, called the League of Mayapan, each of which was overseen by a kalwak or governor.<ref
group="note">Governors, though, were apparently required to reside in Mayapan, so it is unclear who exactly delegated for them in provincial capitals .
</ref><ref
group="note">Later Columbian-period accounts commonly hold the League of Mayapan to have been ruled jointly by Mayapan, Chichen Itza, and Uxmal. Archaeological evidence, however, indicates that the latter cities were virtually deserted during Mayapan's rule </ref>

Columbian 

Chetumal's form of government as a sovereign province is presumed to have (i) remained significantly the same throughout its sovereign period, and (ii) not been significantly different from that of nearby provinces with a halach winik or governor, like Ceh Pech, Mani, and Sotuta.

State offices 

Chetumal's head of state and government was the halach winik or governor, who would also have been the batab or mayor of the province's eponymous capital. His office and title (Ahaw or Lord) were hereditary, and his rule considered a divine right. The office's powers and duties included— 
 exacting tribute from cities, towns or hamlets,
 conscripting men for military service in times of war,
 conducting war,
 sitting as the highest tribunal for inter-municipal conflicts,
 officiating religious ceremonies of state.

At least one of Chetumal's later governors is known to have held authority over at least part of a neighbouring province (Waymil).<ref
group="note">The Waymil Province is not known to have had a halach winik or governor. It may rather have been a confederation of towns, with Maçanahau, Yuyumpeten, and Bacalar being the largest known.
</ref> This was likely effected through the threat of force, rather than diplomacy, as said authority was only reluctantly acceded to.

Local offices 

Immediately subject to the governor were the batabo'ob or mayors of the cities, towns and hamlets of the province. This office was likewise hereditary. The office's powers and duties included–
 having a town farm kept for his pecuniary benefit,
 keeping houses and farms in order,
 sitting as a tribunal of original civil and criminal jurisdiction,
 maintaining the military or militia in times of peace.

The constitution of local government has not been fully elucidated. The following offices were nonetheless known to have been involved in at least some cities, towns or hamlets—
 nakomo'ob or commanders-in-chief, who exercised municipal military authority in the mayor's stead in times of war,
 kuch kabo'ob or aldermen, who severally exercised at least executive authority over kuchteelo'ob or wards, and who jointly, in court or council assembled, exercised veto power over at least some of the mayor's executive, judicial, or military decisions
 kulelo'ob or town officers, who carried out the mayor's orders.

Local government were also responsible for administering the commons, which included all municipal land, as private land ownership either did not exist or was forbidden. It is not clear whether non-municipal land within the province was likewise held in common.

Economy

Capital 

At least since circa 1450, the provincial capital was a major port of call for the peninsular coasting trade from the Ulua River or the Bay Islands to the Ekab Province. It was, at least towards the Columbian period, a large town of circa 2,000 houses, abutted by sapodilla and cacao orchards, maize fields, and apiaries of stingless bees. Its merchant class fully occupied one-fourths of Nito, an out-of-province port of call on Dulce River. It traded the province's cacao, honey, wax, and marine products for obsidian, jade, turquoise, copper, and gold.

Provincial 

The province was the only significant cacao-producer in Yucatan. It provided the capital's merchants with cacao, honey, wax, and marine products. Articles for local consumption are thought to have included–
 pottery from Lamanai and settlements on Honey Camp Lagoon,
 salt and salted fish from settlements on the Northern River Lagoon.<ref
group="note">This activity is known to have declined by circa 1000–1100 AD, likely due to being outcompeted by salt from the northern Yucatan coast .
</ref>

Legacy

Scholarly 

None of Chetumal's records are extant.<ref
group="note">These are presumed to have been copious, given known pre-Columbian record-keeping practice in other Mayan states of the Yucatan peninsula. Most were likely burnt or otherwise destroyed during the Spanish conquest and ensuing proselytising efforts. Any which may have survived are presumed to have decayed past recognition, Chetumal's tropical climate being notoriously unforgiving to bark paper.
</ref> Consequently, all scholarship on the province has relied on later Hispano-Mayan records and modern archaeology.

Archaeological work in Chetumal was begun in early 1894 by Thomas Gann, a medical officer of colonial Belize, in the ruins of Santa Rita, Corozal. His copious work spurred further explorations and excavations in Belize and Mexico by the University of Liverpool, British Museum, Carnegie Institution, Field Museum, Sir J. E. S. Thompson, and Sylvanus Morley. His collections of Mayan artefacts remain in the British Museum, George Gustav Heye Center, National Museums Liverpool, and Middle American Research Institute, with the British Museum receiving the first known collection of Mayan jades. It has been suggested that his work prompted the first legislative protections for antiquities in colonial Belize in 1894, and their subsequent strengthening in 1897, 1924, and 1927.

After Dr. Gann, archaeological work in Chetumal languished until the 1964–1970 Altun Ha Expedition of the Royal Ontario Museum. The project was pushed for by the Archaeological Commissioner of colonial Belize, A. H. Anderson, and led by David M. Pendergast. The substantial corpus generated quickly prompted a renaissance of archaeological work in Chetumal, which has continued to the present day.

Historical work on the Postclassic Mayan states was first published by the Merida-based polymath Juan Francisco Molina Solís in 1896. This was followed by the 1943 and 1957 publications of the Carnegie Mayanist, Ralph L. Roys.<ref
These were both preceded by a University of California, Berkeley PhD thesis, .
</ref> The latter of these has become the authoritative text on the subject, and is most commonly cited as the first of its kind, being significantly more rigorous and complete than preceding works. Despite this progress, Chetumal remained one of the least elucidated provinces until a seminal 1989 publication by Grant D. Jones, then a Professor at Davidson College.

Social

In Mexico 

The modern city of Chetumal, established 5 May 1898 by Vice-Admiral Othón P. Blanco, was named in honour of the eponymous Postclassic capital of the Chetumal Province.

The Guerrero–Kan family are widely believed to have been the first Mestizo family in the Americas. Various public works of art depicting them have been installed in Yucatan and Quintana Roo. These include:

 an untitled sculpture by Raúl Ayala Arellano, installed in Akumal in January 1975
 at least 25 replicas or near-replicas of the aforementioned Ayala Arellano sculpture, including one inaugurated on 16 November 1980 by the 58th President of Mexico, José López Portillo, in Merida
 Nacimiento de la raza mestiza (lit. Birth of the Mestizo Race) by Nereo de la Peña, a mural for the Palacio de Gobierno in Chetumal in 1979
 Forma, color e historia de Quintana Roo (lit. Form, Colour and History of Quintana Roo) by Elio Carmichael Jiménez, a mural inaugurated in Chetumal in 1981 by former Mexican President José López Portillo
 Alegoría del mestizaje (lit. Allegory of Miscegenation) by Carlos Terrés, a sculpture inaugurated in Chetumal on 1 April 1981, by the 1st Governor of Quintana Roo, Jesús Martínez Ross
 Cuna del mestizaje (lit. Trade of Miscegenation) by Rosa María Ponzanelly and Sergio Trejo, a sculpture inaugurated in Chetumal on 25 October 1996 by the 61st President of Mexico, Ernesto Zedillo
 La cuna del mestizaje by Rodrigo Siller, a mural installed 17 November 2007 in the Museum of Mayan Culture, Chetumal
 Gonzalo Guerrero by Fernando Castro Pacheco, an oil painting for the Palacio de Gobierno in Merida

Cancun's residents, upon the arrival of Juan Carlos I and Queen Sofía of Spain on 16 November 1978, gifted the monarchs a turtleshell statuette of Gonzalo Guerrero. Quintana Roo's state anthem, introduced 14 January 1986, celebrates the Guerrero–Kan family. Othon P. Blanco's highest civic honour, introduced 29 September 1997, was named after Guerrero.

In Belize 

On 20 December 2012, the National Institute of Culture and History and the Belize Tourism Industry Association held a public re-enactment of the Guerrero-Kan wedding at Santa Rita, Corozal. Public re-enactments have been held on 22 March 2014, 5 February 2015, 20 February 2016, 6 July 2017, 19 May 2018, and 29 March 2019.

Notes

Citations

References  

 
 
 
 
 
 
 
 
 
 
 
 
 
 
 
 
 
 
 
 
 
 
 

 
 
 
 
 
 
 
 
 
 
 
 
 
 
 
 
 
 
 
 
 
 
 
 
 
 
 
 
 
 
 
 
 
 
 
 
 
 
 
 
 
 
 
 
 
 
 
 
 
 
 
 
 
 
 
 
 
 
 
 
 
 
 
 

Mayan chiefdoms of the Yucatán Peninsula
 
 
History of Belize
Former countries in North America
Maya sites that survived the end of the Classic Period